Plastic China is a 2016 Chinese documentary film depicting the lives of two families who make their living recycling plastic waste imported from developed countries. The film premiered at the International Documentary Film Festival Amsterdam in November 2016, and was shown at the 2017 Sundance Film Festival.

References

2016 films
Chinese-language films
Chinese documentary films
Documentary films about environmental issues